Mohammad Zalimei bin Ishak or better known as Remy Ishak (born on 11 April 1982), is a Malaysian actor who was born in Melaka. He was first introduced to the film industry by independent director Osman Ali in 2006. He gained fame for his performance in Nur Kasih directed by Kabir Bhatia, which aired on TV3 in 2009. He later starred in the 2018 film Pulang.

Personal life 
Remy Ishak married businesswoman Roszaliza "Ezza" Yusof on 21 August 2021 at Masjid Negara after having previously ending their initial engagement in 2019.

Filmography

Film

Television series

Telemovie

Television show

Music video

Theatre

Radio drama

Discography

Soundtrack appearances

Awards and nominations

References

External links
 
 
 

1982 births
Living people
Malaysian Muslims
Malaysian people of Malay descent
People from Malacca
21st-century Malaysian male actors
Malaysian male film actors
Malaysian male television actors
Malaysian television presenters
Malaysian male stage actors
21st-century Malaysian male singers
Malay-language singers
Malaysian male models